Rioja Airlines was a Spanish charter airline based in La Rioja region.

Company history
Rioja Airlines was founded in 2007 by Riojano entrepreneurs. It began operations from the Logroño-Agoncillo Airport in Recajo with flights to Alicante, Sevilla and Málaga.

Its maiden flight was on 24 June 2007 with a flight to Sevilla, but the airline soon ran into financial difficulties and ceased operations only three months later on 9 September 2007. Creditors filed lawsuits against the airline even after it ceased operating.

Fleet
2 ATR 42-400 (on lease)

See also
List of defunct airlines of Spain

References

External links

Rioja Airlines, una aerolínea que se "estrella" a dos meses de su despegue
Qué fue de… Lagun Air | Líneas Aéreas Navarras | Iberline Express | Rioja Airlines

Defunct airlines of Spain
Airlines established in 2007
Airlines disestablished in 2007
Transport in La Rioja (Spain)